Catalina Artusi (born 24 May 1990) is an Argentine actress.

Career 
Catalina Artusi began her career in television in the year 1997 in the series Ricos y Famosos. Her rise to fame came after she was called by Cris Morena to be part of the famous children's television series Chiquititas. From 1999 to 2000, she was part of the cast of the youth television series Verano del '98. In 2000, she had a minor role in the television series Yago, pasión morena. From 2000 to 2001, she was part of the cast of the television series Luna salvaje. In 2001, she makes a small participation in the television series Tiempo final. In 2002, she makes a small participation in the television series Máximo corazón. In 2004, she had a minor role in the television series Culpable de este amor. In 2005, she was part of the cast of the youth television series Floricienta. In 2007, she had a minor role in the television series Son de Fierro. In 2008, she made her film debut, with the movie Visitante de invierno. From 2008 to 2009, she was part of the cast of the television series Don Juan y su bella dama. In 2011, she had a minor role in the television series El elegido. In 2013, she was part of the cast of the television series  Bienvenido Brian. In 2018, she had a minor role in the television series Mi hermano es un clon.

Personal life 
In August 2010, she gave birth to her first child, a boy.

Filmography

Television

Movies

Videoclips

External links
crazysonidojoven.com 
serials.ru, a Russian page about Artusi 

1990 births
Living people
Argentine television actresses
Argentine people of Italian descent
Argentine child actresses